Case Closed: Countdown to Heaven, known as  in Japan, is a 2001 Japanese animated feature film based on the Case Closed manga series, featuring detective Shinichi Kudo, also known as Conan Edogawa. It made 2.9 billion yen.

Plot

The Junior Detective League, Conan, Vi, and Dr. Agasa are on a camping trip. Along the way, they notice Mount Fuji and the newly constructed Twin Towers, the tallest buildings in Japan. During the night, George sees Vi talking to someone while he goes to the restroom.

Meanwhile, Gin and Vodka, on a hunt for Shiho Miyano, sneak into Akemi Miyano's flat and listen to the messages on the answering machine. They discover that Shiho will attend a private viewing of the aforementioned skyscrapers in Tokyo. Gin and Vodka plan to murder Shiho there.

The group visits the Twin Towers, dubbed “the closest thing to heaven”, on their way back home and run into Richard, Rachel, and Serena, in addition to Richard's old friend from college, Madison Monroe, her secretary Cherilyn Chrisabel, Japanese artist Kisaragi Hosui, executive Yoshiaki Hara, Twin Tower councilman Augustine Odell, Twin Towers architect Theodore Radcliff, the latter who once studied architecture under former professor-turned-serial bomber Leo Joel from the first film. Augustine, drunk, invites Madison over for the night in the tower, despite them not officially opened to the public. Madison prepared a room for him anyway. Two employees come up to the VIP elevator and talk about how a nice car pulled up. The other employee says it's a Porsche 356A, catching Conan's attention, who asks for the car's detail which matches that of Gin's. He quickly runs into the elevator looking down briefly, and sees the Porsche drive off as he approaches the entrance. Later that night, the drunk Augustine Odell is brutally murdered.

During the investigation, a broken sake cup is found and the painting Augustine had is missing. Police are drawn to two conclusions on the sake cup: it either simply fell from Odell during the murder, or it was left deliberately as a message. The Junior Detective League conducts their own investigation and interrogates Theodore, who got the job because of Odell, and Kisaragi, who was in the middle of painting Mt. Fuji despite his shades blocking his view. After their questioning, the group disbands. Vi is later seen talking with someone on the phone at Dr. Agasa's house, not realizing Black Organization members Gin and Vodka are listening on the other end.

The following day, the kids resume their investigation by interrogating Yoshiaki Hara. They arrive at his home, find the door slightly opened, and discover Mr. Hara shot to death with a knife in his hand; another broken sake cup is found near his corpse, and police conclude that a serial killer is at large. Hara's computer was erased of its data. Due to the escalating murders, Inspector Meguire pleads with Madison to postpone the Twin Towers grand opening party, but she refuses and invites them instead. Elsewhere, Vodka is searching through Akemi's empty apartment. Gin arrives attempting to track Haibara's location through a phone line, but is cut off when Conan disconnects it from Dr. Agasa's house. Haibara, still grieving over Miyano's death, runs away crying. She explains the next day that hearing her sister's voice helps calm down her. At the Twin Towers, guards have been knocked out with sleeping gas, and bombs have been put in various locations of the complex. Conan wonders if Hara was connected to the Black Organization.

At the grand opening party, Madison hosts a 30-second guessing game in which Richard wins by pure luck. She then shows off Kisaragi's art in a presentation on stage with Kisaragi, Theodore, and Cherilyn handling the production backstage. As the curtain rises, the audience is horrified to see Madison hanging above the stage with Kisaragi's painting in the background. An unbroken sake cup found below her corpse; a message left by the serial killer. A rattling noise is heard as the remaining suspects walk away. While searching for a motive, Conan solves the case thanks to a hint provided by Haibara.

Before the murderer's identity is revealed, the bombs planted by the Black Organization detonate, setting the building ablaze. Serena, Conan and Rachel evacuate in a glass elevator when it stops. Conan realizes that with her new perm, Serena looks like Shiho Miyano from behind. Conan distracts Serena, making her turn around, saving her from being shot by Gin, who thought she was Shiho.

After arriving safely to the ground, Conan re-enters the tower after learning that the Junior Detective League has not evacuated. He leaves them and confronts the serial killer, Kisaragi. He murdered Madison by taking off her pearl necklace, then placed an identical one with fishing line, attached to the top of his painting, around her neck. Kisaragi left broken sake cups behind as a symbol of Mount Fuji that had been obscured by the Twin Towers; the unbroken one at Madison's scene didn't need to be smashed, Madison's corpse already splitted the image of the mountain. Conan elaborates how Hara was murdered by Gin; the silver knife in his hand wasn't for defense, it was to identify his killer. Silver in Japanese means gin. Kisaragi left his sale cup to make it look like the work of a serial killer. As evidence, Kisaragi has Madison's original pearl necklace in his cane, hence the rattling noise as he walks. Kisaragi confesses, blaming the tower employees for the construction of the towers, an edifice that obstructed his view of Mount Fuji. Conan shoots Kisaragi with his tranquilizer dart as the painter prepares to commit suicide.

With the bridges blown off and the bottom floors in flames, Conan powers a Ford Mustang convertible with the force of an explosion to propel the kids and him to safety. Viewing the inferno from afar, Gin and Vodka confirm that Shiho Miyano was not at the towers and abandon their search for her.

Cast

Music
The film's ending theme song is "Always" by Mai Kuraki.

Home media

VHS
The VHS of the film was released on April 10, 2002. It was discontinued soon after 2006 as it was switched to DVD.

Region 2 DVD
The DVD of the film was released on December 21, 2001. A new DVD was released on February 25, 2011, significantly lowering the original price and added the trailer as a special feature.

Region 1 DVD
Funimation released the English dub of Countdown to Heaven on DVD on January 19, 2010.

Blu-ray
The Blu-ray version of the film was released on September 23, 2011. The Blu-ray contains the same content of the DVD plus a mini-booklet explaining the film and the BD-live function.

Reception
Carl Kimlinger of Anime News Network gave a mixed review of the film, saying it suffers from tonal inconsistency when going from "familiar character shtick to sleuthing to Towering Inferno-meets-Die Hard derring-do" and felt the overarching mystery was a disposable side thought, but praised the inclusion of Gin and Vodka in the story and the "action-packed finale" in the skyscrapers.

References

External links
 
 

2001 anime films
Countdown to Heaven
Films directed by Kenji Kodama
Films set in Tokyo
Funimation
TMS Entertainment
Toho animated films